Norsk Ukeblad (English: “Norwegian Weekly Magazine”) is a Norwegian language weekly family magazine published in  Oslo, Norway.

History and profile
Norsk Ukeblad was established in 1933. It is owned by the Egmont Group and published weekly by the Hjemmet Mortensen AB. The magazine has its headquarters in Oslo. The editor is Maj-Lis Stordal.

Its target group is women 25 years and older. The magazine contains features as well as articles on food, interior decoration, health, fashion, and beauty.

Circulation
The circulation of Norsk Ukeblad was 154,000 copies in 2003, making it the second best-selling general interest magazine in Norway. The magazine had a circulation of 126,400 copies in 2006 and 126,591 copies in 2007. In 2013 Norsk Ukeblad was the fifth best-selling magazine in Norway with a circulation of 77,191 copies.

See also
 List of Norwegian magazines

References

External links
 Official website

1933 establishments in Norway
Magazines established in 1933
Magazines published in Oslo
Norwegian-language magazines
Weekly magazines published in Norway
Women's magazines published in Norway